Q-Force is an American adult animated comedy series on Netflix. In April 2019, Netflix ordered 10 episodes of the series, with Gabe Liedman as a showrunner, along with Sean Hayes, Todd Milliner, and others as executive producers. It was released on September 2, 2021.

On June 27, 2022, Netflix cancelled the series after one season.

Premise 
This series is about Queer Force (Q-Force), a group of undervalued LGBT superspies, and is centered on a gay secret agent who is like James Bond, Steve Maryweather (also known as Agent Mary), as they try to prove themselves on personal and professional adventures. One day, Mary decides to prove himself to the American Intelligence Agency (AIA), solve a case, and get the approval of the agency, but they have to add a new member to their team, a straight man.

Voice cast and characters

Main
 Steve Maryweather (voiced by Sean Hayes) – Also known as Agent Mary, Steve was formerly a rising star of the AIA before he came out as gay. He heads the Q-Force team consisting of himself, Stat, Twink, and Deb.
 Twink (voiced by Matt Rogers) – A gay French Canadian who is a "Master of drag" and part of the Q-Force. 
 Deb (voiced by Wanda Sykes) – A skilled lesbian mechanic who is part of the Q-Force and has a wife.
 Stat (voiced by Patti Harrison) – A transgender lesbian hacker who is part of the Q-Force.
 Director Dirk Chunley (voiced by Gary Cole) – The director of the AIA who is straight and hard-nosed.
 Agent Rick Buck (voiced by David Harbour) – A straight agent brought into the Q-Force team once they became official spies, serving as a liaison between them and the AIA.
 V (voiced by Laurie Metcalf) – The deputy director of the AIA and highest-ranking woman in the agency, who has a soft spot for Mary.

Recurring
 Benji (voiced by Gabe Liedman) – A gay man who is the love interest of Mary.
 Mira Popadopolous (voiced by Stephanie Beatriz) – The princess of Gyenorvya who is dating Buck.
 Chasten Barkley (voiced by Dan Levy) - A billionaire entrepreneur and long-time friend of Mary's.
 Caryn (voiced by Niecy Nash) - V's former partner.
 Louisa Desk (voice by Fortune Feimster) - Dirk Chunley's assistant and security guard.

Episodes

Production and release
Hayes and Milliner had been considering the idea for the series for some time. Milliner called a spy TV series tough to make and Hayes said that they were thinking how to get such a series, and have it animated, while having "the fun parts of a James Bond film." He added that animation allows for "freedom" to do more than a live-action series. Milliner also said that he wasn't sure if studios would greenlight "a feature with a leading character that's gay in that genre" and noted that it "one of the last bastions of masculinity" that can't be broken down. He further said that teaming up with co-creator Michael Schur happened quickly because he had been friends from a while back, and asked him if he wanted to work on the project, with Schur saying yes. Liedman later told Animation Magazine that the show began with the idea to about "a gay James Bond," and that he, along with Hayes and Milliner, came up with the idea for "an ensemble comedy about queer secret agents." Following this, Liedman, Hayes, Milliner and Schur pitched the idea to Universal Television, which approved of the idea, and it was sold to Netflix.

In April 2019, Netflix ordered 10 episodes of the series. It was also said that each episode would be 30 minutes long. At the same time, some reported that Sean Hayes would voice the series protagonist. Also in April 2019, Gabe Liedman as the showrunner, along with Sean Hayes, and Todd Milliner, and various others, as executive producers, were confirmed. Liedman later revealed that they "always knew" that Hayes would play the protagonist. Liedman, also said in December 2019, the show's writers "started putting the episodes together."

In January 2020, it was reported that the series would be animated by Titmouse, Inc.'s Canadian studio. In April 2020, Animation Magazine and Deadline reported that the show was one of the many series that the Writers Guild of America West negotiated deals with in order to ensure that production for the animated series proceeded even with the COVID-19 pandemic. In a later interview, Liedman said that more than half of the writing, and all of the acting, and animation had to be "done in isolation" due to the pandemic, noting that the show's first season "took about 18 months to finish." In September 2020, it was reported that Guy Branum would be a co-executive producer for the series. In December 2020, Deadline described Q-Force as an "upcoming animated series." Chloe Keenan was also confirmed as a writer for the show.

In January 2021 it was reported that Matt Rogers, the host of HBO Max's Haute Dog, served as a staff writer for the show. It was also reported that Charlie Nagelhout, a 2D artist, would be working as a prop designer at Titmouse on the series. In May 2021, it was reported that non-binary comedian Zackery Alexzander Stephens will be working on the show in some capacity, In June 2021, Gary Cole,  David Harbour, Patti Harrison, Laurie Metcalf, Matt Rogers, Wanda Sykes, and Gabe Liedman joined the voice cast. The same month, it was confirmed that Hazy Mills Productions, a company run by Hayes, would be one of the companies producing the series. Fremulon and 3 Arts Entertainment were also reported to be the ones producing the series with the help of Universal Television.

On June 23, 2021, a 40-second teaser for the series was released. Reuben Baron of CBR noted that those on Twitter claimed that the series had various stereotypes and attacked those behind the show, leading some storyboarders to lock their Twitter accounts. Baron argued that while there were some stereotypical jokes in the trailer, he said that the trailer's "stereotypical gay jokes" center around one of the protagonists, and that some of the responses to one of the characters, Twink, shows "internal prejudices within the gay community." One of the show's animators, Alanna Train, criticized the trailer, saying it did not truly represent the show, and its characters, adding that many queer artists worked on the show itself. Liedman later said, in response to questions about the trailer, that he wanted to make people laugh, and "offer them a few hours of entertainment, rather than wanting to shock audiences." Rogers told The A.V. Club that he didn't think the trailer was 'a great representation of what the show is" and he understands the response, but added he respects the people who worked on the show.

On August 12, a trailer for the series was released and received more positively than the teaser which had been released in June. Following the trailer's release, Leidman, when interviewed by CBS8, said that it was important to build the story "into an ensemble comedy" and to tell the "story of the wider [LGBTQ] community" with the show.

Before the show's release, Liedman told Animation Magazine that the show's visuals were inspired by animation in BoJack Horseman and Archer and called Andrew Goldberg, the showrunner of Big Mouth, his "teacher and mentor," and praised John Rice, the supervising director of the show, as a key to ensure the show's production and completion. He also called Matt Rogers, the show's "breakout star" and described The Simpsons as deeply influencing him. He argued that a "message of acceptance and LGBTQ+ equality and pride" is integrated into the show, which he called "super fun and exciting." In another interview with Consequence, Liedman said that the series builds upon his work on PEN15, Big Mouth, and Brooklyn Nine-Nine, while also noting references in the series to L.A. Confidential and The Princess Diaries and inspiration from Mission: Impossible and Jason Bourne film series. Rogers, in an interview with Gay City News, said he came to embody the character of Twink after reading the show's pilot script, and said he 'gravitated towards him naturally." In response to a question about the show's stereotypes, he said that he understood the "hesitancy and difficulty to swallow queer content by queer audiences," and noted the anxiety over seeing such characters and representation. He further defended the show, saying that people do talk like Twink and hopes that people embrace the show due to the "many queer identities represented" in the show, calling the show "a very sweet story about a chosen family."

The first season was released on September 2, 2021. On the day of the show's premiere, Liedman, in an interview with ET, said that the adventures the characters embark on have big stakes, with "a world hanging in the balance." He also defended the show's maturity, noting that it is "a show for adults" and said "people can handle it or they can turn it off, you know?" On September 6, in an article with The A.V. Club, Rogers said that Twink's "use of code-switching as a superpower" was clever, and praised the character, calling getting the role a "unique opportunity." He further said that people are going to have different reactions to the show, but describing it as a whole "by queer people, for queer people."

Reception

Pre-release
The release of the trailer on June 23 was met with heavily polarized reactions. Reuben Baron of CBR was apprehensive about the show, saying he wasn't sure if the show would be any good and that the show's humor is "not for everyone," but said that the fact the show is written, starring, and animated by queer people makes a difference. He also concluded that no matter how the show turns out, it is "not being made from a place of bigotry," telling people to wait until the show's release to criticize it. Charles Pulliam-Moore of Gizmodo stated that the show's "premise and the jokes in the trailer come across like a much more tame and recognizable go at the kind of queer pandering the show itself calls out," but that it "might end up having something interesting to say when it premieres." Gavia Baker-Whitelaw of The Daily Dot stated that the trailer "looks kind of cringeworthy, focusing on stereotypes and unfunny one-liners" and that the show "seems destined to join the ranks of mediocre adult animated sitcoms." Baker-Whitelaw also said that despite the fact the show is "walking the walk in terms of queer representation," it doesn't guarantee the show will be good, and said the show feels corny, dated, and as sophisticated as The Ambiguously Gay Duo. Farid-ul-Haq of The Geekiary argued that while he was excited by the show back in 2019, his excitement disappeared after watching the trailer, saying the trailer "seems to be relying too much on problematic queer stereotypes," concluding that while there is an interesting story, it is not right to harass those associated with the series, like artists and animators. Matt Moen of Paper said that the show, as based on the trailer, would not be subtle or nuanced in its "queer-centric humor," but concluded that it remained to be seen whether the show would be entertaining and groundbreaking or "woefully two-dimensional."

In contrast, Michael Cuby of Them was more positive, saying the show sounded "ridiculously entertaining," even before the trailer dropped, and saying that with the reveal of the cast, they would add it to their Netflix queue. Additionally, Cuby said they were "intrigued by the premise," were excited by the trailer, and praised the "queer-affirming dialogue." May Rude of Out stated that the trailer was "filled with comedy, action, and plenty of pure and beautiful homosexuality" and argued that the show "could be the queer adult cartoon we’ve been waiting for!"

Critical reception 

Q-Force received mixed to negative reviews from critics. The review aggregator website Rotten Tomatoes reported a 33% approval rating with an average rating of 3.40/10, based on 13 reviews. The website's critics consensus reads, "Q-Forces heart is in the right place, but dated stereotypes and a general lack of humor make this animated action adventure fall flat." Metacritic, which uses a weighted average, assigned a score of 45 out of 100 based on 7 critics, indicating "mixed or average reviews".

B.L. Panther of The Spool described the show as "splendidly queer" and praised the show for its ability to "sketch sex and desire as an integral part of queerness," but criticized it for showing "queer culture" only as defined by cisgender White gay people, and its attempt to "force acceptance and assimilation" as something that is important to the show's characters, and hoped the show would improve in future seasons. Mika A. Epstein of LezWatch.TV said that one of her favorite things about the show is that "they let us know the actor pronouns are the same as their characters." Tariq Raouf of the San Francisco Chronicle was more critical, arguing that the series feels "like a mockery of LGBTQ people" despite its creative team and cast, stating that the show tries "too hard to be hip, queer and fun," making it somewhat offensive and "stale." Reuben Baron of CBR gave a similar assessment, describing the show as "disappointingly unfunny," and
said the show has the sense that "it's coming out 10 years later than it should have." He also called the characters themselves a "mixed bag," and concluded the story is "watchable but mediocre." Farid-ul-Haq of The Geekiary said the show would be better if it aired in the early 2000s. He also criticized the inclusion of Buck's character.

David Feinberg of The Hollywood Reporter said that while the show is not as "bad as Netflix's initial promotion suggested," the episodes rely on "many exhausted tropes." Even so, he called it watchable due to the "dynamic animation from Titmouse," distinctive and expressive characters, and talented voice actors. He concluded that it was a "typically bumpy start for a comedy" trying to find its footing. Daniel D'Addario, Chief TV Critic for Variety concurred, saying the protagonist, Steve, "doesn't hold the center of the show" while arguing that the supporting characters "fare somewhat better" than Steve's character. Michael Blackmon of BuzzFeed News added that the show is "weighed down by uninteresting characters and dull 'jokes,'" and that though the show "finds its footing toward the middle," he wanted more from the show.

Other reviews were also mixed. Glen Weldon of NPR called the show warmer and kinder than Archer, and said he had "unfair assumptions" going into the series but it had "surprisingly gentle and humane" jokes. He added that while the characters initially embody "very broad queer stereotypes," they later go beyond this, and that if the show gets a second season, it could be improved by shining more on "members of the team besides Maryweather." Andy Swift of TVLine called the series "irreverent" and described the first episode as a "fun set-up" to the rest of the series.

Cancellation 
Q-Force was not renewed by Netflix for a second season. Matt Rogers (Voice of Twink) confirmed this on the Spotify podcast Attitudes!, simply stating that "It did not get a second season". Some described the cancellation as among "major losses for queer storytelling on television" and predicted a Peacock revival may be possible.

References

External links

2021 American television series debuts
2021 American television series endings
2020s American adult animated television series
English-language Netflix original programming
2020s American LGBT-related animated television series
2020s American LGBT-related comedy television series
American adult animated action television series
American adult animated comedy television series
American flash adult animated television series
Drag (clothing) television shows
Gay-related television shows
Lesbian-related television shows
Television series about intelligence agencies
Television series by Hazy Mills Productions
Television series by Universal Television
Television series by 3 Arts Entertainment
Television series by Fremulon
American spy comedy television series